René Paraj (born 14 August 1992) is a Slovak footballer who plays for Železiarne Podbrezová as a midfielder.

Club career

FK Pohronie
Paraj collected almost 200 league caps for Pohronie across 3. Liga and 2. Liga, scoring 17 league goals. While with the club, he contributed to its promotion from 3. Liga. 

He made his 2. Liga debut for Pohronie against FO ŽP Šport Podbrezová, in an away fixture, on 20 July 2013. Pohronie lost 1:0, after a goal by a former international Michal Pančík. Paraj completed 66 minutes of the game before being replaced by Martin Sedliak.

FK Železiarne Podbrezová
Paraj made his professional debut for Železiarne Podbrezová against Nitra on 16 February 2019. Paraj replaced injured Jozef Pastorek in the stoppage time of the first half.

Honours
Pohronie
3. Liga: 2012–13

References

External links
 FK Železiarne Podbrezová official club profile 
 
 Futbalnet profile 
 

1992 births
Living people
Sportspeople from Žiar nad Hronom
Slovak footballers
Association football midfielders
MFK Lokomotíva Zvolen players
FK Pohronie players
FK Železiarne Podbrezová players
Slovak Super Liga players
2. Liga (Slovakia) players
3. Liga (Slovakia) players